Maggie Miller is a mathematician, Visiting Clay Fellow, and Stanford Science Fellow at Stanford University in the Mathematics Department. Her primary research area is low-dimensional topology.

Professional career
Miller earned her PhD in Mathematics from Princeton University, where she was advised by mathematician David Gabai and wrote her dissertation on extending fibrations of knot complements to ribbon disk complements. Prior to graduate school, she completed her undergraduate studies at University of Texas at Austin.

After completing her doctoral degree, Miller worked as an NSF Postdoctoral Fellow from 2020-2021 at the Massachusetts Institute of Technology. She now works as a Visiting Clay Fellow and Stanford Science Fellow at Stanford University.

Awards and honors
Miller was awarded a 2021 Clay Research Fellowship by the Clay Mathematics Institute for her work to expand topological research of manifolds. Her contributions were described by MIT as "important...to long-standing problems in low-dimensional topology." Clay Research Fellowships are awarded to recent PhD-holders who are selected for their research accomplishments and potential as leaders in mathematics research.

In her current position at Stanford, she is also a Stanford Science Fellow. Fellowships are awarded to early career scientists who have demonstrated scientific achievement and advancement, as well as a desire to collaborate with a diverse scholarly community.

Prior to her appointment at Stanford, Miller was awarded a National Science Foundation Mathematical Sciences Postdoc Research Fellowship while at MIT in the Department of Mathematics. She also has a record of accomplishment during her graduate studies, having been awarded the Princeton Mathematics Graduate Teaching Award in 2018 and the Charlotte Elizabeth Procter Fellowship in 2019.

She received the 2023 Maryam Mirzakhani New Frontiers Prize, one of the Breakthrough Prizes.

References

American mathematicians
Princeton University alumni
Stanford University fellows
American women mathematicians
Year of birth missing (living people)
Living people